The Syriac Infancy Gospel, also known as the Arabic Infancy Gospel, is a New Testament apocryphal writing concerning the infancy of Jesus. It may have been compiled as early as the sixth century, and was partly based on the Infancy Gospel of Thomas, the Gospel of James, and the Gospel of Pseudo-Matthew. The only two surviving manuscripts date from 1299 AD and the 15th/16th century in Arabic. They were copied in the area of northern Iraq and show influence from the Quran.

Contents
It consists of three parts:
The birth of Jesus – based on the Protevangelium of James
Miracles during the Flight into Egypt – seemingly based on nothing more than local traditions
The miracles of Jesus as a boy – based on the Infancy Gospel of Thomas

It contains a number of embellishments on the earlier text, however, including a diaper (of Jesus) that heals people, sweat (of Jesus) that turns into balm, curing leprosy, and dyeing cloth varied colours using only indigo dye. It also claims earlier encounters for Jesus with Judas Iscariot, and with the thieves with whom he is later crucified, as well as being one of the earliest documents.

Dating
Although this Gospel is thought to have originated from Syriac sources dating back to the fifth or sixth century, it has become known to European readers by way of an Arabic version published by Henry Sike in 1697 together with a Latin translation. The preface to the William Hone translation states, "It was received by the Gnostics, a sect of Christians in the second century..." The earliest known mention of the Gospel was by Isho'dad of Merv, a ninth-century Syrian church father, in his biblical commentary concerning the Gospel of Matthew. The narrative of the Arabic Infancy Gospel, particularly the second part concerning the miracles in Egypt, can also be found in the Quran. Some critical scholarship claim its presence in the Qu'ran may be due to the influence the Gospel had among the Arabs. It is not known for certain that the Gospel was present in the Hejaz, but it can be seen as likely. However, according to Islamic scholars the Gospel was translated into Arabic in the post-Islamic period due to the difficulty that 16th century Europeans would have in translating early Arabic's defective script into Latin as well as the extreme rarity of written texts in Pre-Islamic Arabia. Most recent research in the field of Islamic studies by Sydney Griffith et al. (2013), David D. Grafton (2014), Clair Wilde (2014) & ML Hjälm et al. (2016 & 2017) assert that "all one can say about the possibility of a pre-Islamic, Christian version of the Gospel in Arabic is that no sure sign of its actual existence has yet emerged." Additionally ML Hjälm in her most recent research (2017) inserts that "manuscripts containing translations of the gospels are encountered no earlier than the year 873".

Quranic parallels
One parallel story between an Infancy Gospel and the Quran is found in the Arabic Gospel of The Infancy of the Savior and Surah 19:29–34, where the story of Jesus speaking as a baby in the cradle is narrated.

The Arabic Gospel of the Infancy of the Savior:

v2
"He has said that Jesus spoke, and, indeed, when He was lying in His cradle said to Mary His mother: I am Jesus, the Son of God, the Logos, whom thou hast brought forth, as the Angel Gabriel announced to thee; and my Father has sent me for the salvation of the world."

Abdullah Yusuf Ali The Quran

Surah 19:29–34

"But she pointed to the babe. They said: "How can we talk to one who is a child in the cradle?" He said: "I am indeed a servant of Allah: He hath given me revelation and made me a prophet; And He hath made me blessed wheresoever I be, and hath enjoined on me Prayer and Charity as long as I live; (He) hath made me kind to my mother, and not overbearing or miserable; So peace is on me the day I was born, the day that I die, and the day that I shall be raised up to life (again)"! Such (was) Jesus the son of Mary: (it is) a statement of truth, about which they (vainly) dispute.

Zoroastrian connection
The third chapter of this Gospel covers the story of the wise men of the East, which, in some respects, closely follows the version of the story from Matthew. Unlike Matthew, however, this account cites Zoradascht (Zoroaster) as the source of the prophecy that motivated the wise men to seek the infant Jesus.

See also
Acts of the Apostles (genre)
Agrapha
List of Gospels
New Testament apocrypha
Pseudepigraphy
Textual criticism

References

Further reading
New Testament Apocrypha, vol. 1, Philadelphia: Westminster Press, 1963
Elliott, James K. The Apocryphal New Testament: A Collection of Apocryphal Christian Literature in an English Translation. Oxford: Oxford University Press, 1993.

External links

Catholic Encyclopedia – The Arabic Gospel of the Infancy of the Saviour
 The Arabic Gospel of The Infancy of The Saviour – At Wesley center for applied theology.
  Is The Bible Really The Source Of The Qur'ân?
   The Apocryphal New Testament "The Arabic Infancy Gospel"

Arabic
5th-century Christian texts